General elections were held in Malaysia between Thursday, 22 April and Monday, 26 April 1982. Voting took place in all 154 parliamentary constituencies of Malaysia, each electing one Member of Parliament to the Dewan Rakyat, the dominant house of Parliament. State elections also took place in 293 state constituencies (except Sabah and Sarawak) on the same day. It was the first election for Mahathir Mohamed as Prime Minister since his appointment to this position in 1981.

The result was a victory for Barisan Nasional, which won 132 of the 154 seats. Voter turnout was 74%.

Results

By state

Johore

Kedah

Kelantan

Kuala Lumpur

Malacca

Negri Sembilan

Pahang

Penang

Perak

Perlis

Sabah

Sarawak

Selangor

Trengganu

See also
1982 Malaysian state elections

Notes

References

General elections in Malaysia
Malaysia
General